Gloria Emanuelle Widjaja (born 28 December 1993) is an Indonesian badminton player affiliated with PB Djarum since 2007. She was the 2011 Indonesia National and World Junior Champions in the mixed doubles event. For her achievements, Widjaja was awarded as the best Djarum player of the year. She won her first senior international title in 2014 Macau Open Grand Prix Gold.

Career 
Widjaja made a debut in the international tournament at the 2010 Indonesia International Challenge, reaching in to the quarterfinals in the women's and mixed doubles event. She was selected to join national junior team compete at the 2011 Asian and World Junior Championships. Teamed-up with Alfian Eko Prasetya, they emerged as the mixed doubles world junior champion, beating their compatriots Ronald Alexander and Tiara Rosalia Nuraidah in the rubber games 12–21, 21–17, 25–23 in the final. In 2012, she and Prasetya finished as the runner-up at the 2012 India International Challenge after defeated by the first seeded Irfan Fadhilah and Weni Anggraini in the final.

In early 2013, Widjaja started her partnership with the 2012 World junior champion, Edi Subaktiar. The duo competed at the 2013 Asian Championships, but lost to South Korean pair Ko Sung-hyun and Kim Ha-na in the first round. At the 2013 Indonesia Open Grand Prix Gold, they failed to advance to the final stage, had upset by the six seeded Praveen Jordan and Vita Marissa in the semifinal.

In 2014, Widjaja became the semifinalists at the Malaysia Grand Prix Gold, Indonesia Masters, Bulgarian International, Dutch Open with Edi Subaktiar, New Zealand Open with Irfan Fadhilah, and at the Indonesia International with Alfian Eko Prasetya. In November 2014, she and Subaktiar clinched their first title at the Grand Prix Gold tournament in Macau Open.

Widjaja started the 2015 season by competing at the Malaysia Masters Grand Prix Gold with Edi Subaktiar. They reached in to the semifinals round, but lost to their teammates Praveen Jordan and Debby Susanto. The duo then took the title at the Austrian Open. Widjaja and Subaktiar made their first appearance at the semifinals of the BWF Super Series event in India Open, and at the China Masters Grand Prix Gold, they grabbed the runner-up podium. In August 2015, she qualified to compete at the World Championships in Jakarta as the 12th seeded with Subaktiar. They finished in the third round, after defeated by the 8th seeded from South Korea Ko Sung-hyun and Kim Ha-na.

In mid 2016, Widjaja paired with Riky Widianto compete at the Chinese Taipei Open, and the new pair finished in the semifinals round. In 2017, Widjaja teamed-up with the 2016 Olympic gold medalist Tontowi Ahmad, but their partnership did not last long. Their best achievement was the semifinalist at the Malaysia Masters. Widjaja then paired up again with Edi Subaktiar, but due to injury suffered by Subaktiar at the Southeast Asian Games, she's getting a new partner again with Hafiz Faizal. They ended the 2017 BWF Season by achieve the semifinals in Bitburger Open and Korea Masters.

In 2018, Widjaja comes up with Hafiz Faizal, they showed their good performance by beat the seeded players to reach the semifinals round at the Malaysia Masters, but their pace intercepted by the 5th seeded Zheng Siwei and Huang Yaqiong. At the BWF Super 1000 Indonesia Open, they also finished in the semifinals. The partnership finally won their first title at the BWF Super 500 Thailand Open, beat the top seeded Chris and Gabby Adcock of England in the final with the score 21–12, 21–12.

In 2019, Widjaja reached the finals of German Open with Hafiz Faizal, but they were defeated by South Korean pair Seo Seung-jae and Chae Yoo-jung in straight games. In April, Widjaja and Faizal beat the Olympic Games silver medalists Chan Peng Soon and Goh Liu Ying to reach the semi-finals of Singapore Open, but they were stopped to another Malaysian pair Tan Kian Meng and Lai Pei Jing in a close rubber games. At the Oceania tour, she and her partner finished as the semi-finalists in New Zealand and quarter-finalists in Australian Open. Widjaja featured in Indonesian squad that won the bronze medal in Sudirman Cup. In July, she and Faizal beat the world number 1 Zheng Siwei and Huang Yaqiong in the quarter-finals of Japan Open, but the duo lost to their compatriot Praveen Jordan and Melati Daeva Oktavianti in the semi-finals. In August, she and her partner played at the World Championships held in Basel, Switzerland, but this time they lost to Zheng and Huang in the third round. In the remaining of the 2019 tour, their best results were the semi-finalists in Chinese Taipei and Hong Kong Open. Widjaja and Faizal qualified to compete at the World Tour Finals in Guangzhou, but only finished third in the group B standings. Widjaja and Faizal reached a career high as mixed doubles world number 6 in May 2019.

In 2020, Widjaja started the season as the semi-finalists in Malaysia Masters with her partner Hafiz Faizal. Two weeks later, the duo finished as the finalist in Thailand Masters lost to English pair Marcus Ellis and Lauren Smith in rubber games.

2022 
In 2022, Widjaja formed a new partnership with Dejan Ferdinansyah, after she was dismissed from the national team. In March, they played in All England Open and lost in second round to four seeds and eventual winners Yuta Watanabe and Arisa Higashino of Japan. In the next tour, Swiss Open, they lost in first round. In May, they lost in the second round of Thailand Open from four seeds Wang Yilyu and Huang Dongping of China.

They won their first title as a pair in the Denmark Masters, and then clinched the home soil title in the Indonesia International Series. They later won their third consecutive title as a pair at the Vietnam Open where they defeated their compatriots Rehan Naufal Kusharjanto and Lisa Ayu Kusumawati in two games. In mid October, they clinched their fourth consecutive title by winning the Malang Indonesia International tournament. Their winning streak was then stopped by the Chinese pair Jiang Zhenbang and Wei Yaxin in the semi-finals of the Indonesia Masters, and their ranking shot to the top 50 in the world. In mid November, they reach the semi-finals of the Australian Open. They reached the career-highest ranking of 20 in the final weeks of 2022.

2023 
In January, Widjaja with Ferdinansyah lost in the semi-finals of Malaysia Open from first seed Chinese pair Zheng Siwei and Huang Yaqiong. In the next tournament, they lost in the second round of the India Open from Japanese pair Kyohei Yamashita and Naru Shinoya. They competed in the home tournament, Indonesia Masters, but unfortunately lost in the quarter-finals from Japanese pair Yuki Kaneko and Misaki Matsutomo. In the next tournament, they lost in the quarter-finals of the Thailand Masters from 6th seed Chinese pair Feng Yanzhe and Olympic champion Huang Dongping.

In March, they competed in the European tour, but unfortunately lost in the second round of German Open from Hong Kong pair Lee Chun Hei and Ng Tsz Yau.

Achievements

BWF World Junior Championships 
Mixed doubles

BWF World Tour (2 titles, 2 runners-up) 
The BWF World Tour, which was announced on 19 March 2017 and implemented in 2018, is a series of elite badminton tournaments sanctioned by the Badminton World Federation (BWF). The BWF World Tour is divided into levels of World Tour Finals, Super 1000, Super 750, Super 500, Super 300, and the BWF Tour Super 100.

Mixed doubles

BWF Grand Prix (1 title, 1 runner-up) 
The BWF Grand Prix had two levels, the Grand Prix and Grand Prix Gold. It was a series of badminton tournaments sanctioned by the Badminton World Federation (BWF) and played between 2007 and 2017.

Mixed doubles

  BWF Grand Prix Gold tournament
  BWF Grand Prix tournament

BWF International Challenge/Series (4 titles, 1 runner-up) 
Mixed doubles

  BWF International Challenge tournament
  BWF International Series tournament

BWF Junior International 
Girls' doubles

  BWF Junior International Grand Prix tournament
  BWF Junior International Challenge tournament
  BWF Junior International Series tournament
  BWF Junior Future Series tournament

Performance timeline

National team 
 Junior level

 Senior level

Individual competitions

Junior level  
 Girls' doubles

 Mixed doubles

Senior level

Women's doubles

Mixed doubles

Record against selected opponents 
Record against year-end Finals finalists, World Championships semi-finalists, and Olympic quarter-finalists.

Edi Subaktiar 
Widjaja and Subaktiar partnership had never led in record meetings against top pairs. They had a poor head-to-head record against Ko Sung-hyun and Kim Ha-na (0–6).

Hafiz Faizal 
Partnered with Hafiz Faizal, the duo managed to lead the head-to-head record against English pair Chris and Gabby Adcock (+2); German pair Mark Lamsfuß and Isabel Lohau (+3); and also Hong Kong pair Lee Chun Hei and Chau Hoi Wah (+1). Contrary, they had a bad head-to-head record against Chinese pair Zheng Siwei and Huang Yaqiong (–6); and also Thai pair Dechapol Puavaranukroh and Sapsiree Taerattanachai (–6).

References 

1993 births
Living people
People from Bekasi
Sportspeople from West Java
Indonesian female badminton players
Southeast Asian Games bronze medalists for Indonesia
Southeast Asian Games medalists in badminton
Competitors at the 2017 Southeast Asian Games